Eslamabad-e Jelin (also Romanized as Eslāmābād-e Jelīn; also known as Eslāmābād) is a village in Estarabad-e Jonubi Rural District, in the Central District of Gorgan County, Golestan Province, Iran. At the 2006 census, its population was 1,288, in 278 families.

References 

Populated places in Gorgan County